During the 1997–98 Italian football season, Società Sportiva Lazio competed in the Serie A, Coppa Italia and UEFA Cup.

Season review
Lazio appointed a new coach in Sven-Göran Eriksson, snatching the Swede from an almost readied contract with Blackburn Rovers. Ex-Sampdoria man Eriksson brought playmaking secondary striker Roberto Mancini with him. In addition, he signed Vladimir Jugović and Alen Bokšić from Juventus, with Bokšić embarking on a second tenure at Lazio. Matias Almeyda also arrived at the club from Spanish side Sevilla, while wing-back Giuseppe Pancaro, signed from Cagliari, also proved to be a key player.

The new players managed to form an effective unit that was involved in the battle for the title until the 28th round, when they lost 1–0 at home to Juventus in a game that completely turned the tide for Lazio. The loss to Juventus had a detrimental effect on the team's form and led to a poor run of one point in six matches, dropping the team down to seventh. It was the club's worst league position for more than five years, but Eriksson was saved by the fact that the team had been seriously in the hunt for the scudetto for the first time, plus it reached the finals of both the Coppa Italia and the UEFA Cup. Lazio won the Coppa Italia, but stood no chance against Inter and on-song Ronaldo in the UEFA Cup final, eventually losing 3–0.

The 1997–98 season also saw the departure of club legend Giuseppe Signori, who failed to get on with Eriksson and was duly sold to Sampdoria as a long-overdue replacement for Mancini. Given the team's strong form at the time, his departure did not cause the same riots as happened when he was on the verge of being sold to Parma in 1995.

Lazio's best player during the season was arguably Pavel Nedvěd, the Czech winger scoring eleven goals and revelling in the confidence he got from Eriksson.

Players

Squad information
Squad at end of season

Transfers

Autumn

In

 from Sampdoria
 from Juventus
 from Juventus
 from Sevilla CF
 from Cagliari Calcio

Left club during season

Competitions

Serie A

Results by round

League table

Matches

Coppa Italia

Second round

Round of 16

Quarter-finals

Semi-finals

Final

UEFA Cup

First round

Second round

Third round

Quarter-finals

Semi-finals

Final

Statistics

Players statistics

Goalscorers
  Pavel Nedvěd 11
  Alen Bokšić 10
  Diego Fuser 8
  Roberto Mancini 5
  Roberto Rambaudi 4

References

S.S. Lazio seasons
Lazio